Gymkhana Club is the club or gentleman's club associated with gymkhana, a British-colonial term for sports club; many are called simply Gymkhana in short.

 Bombay Gymkhana
 Colombo Gymkhana Club
 Delhi Gymkhana
 Gymkhana Club, Chennai
 Hindu Gymkhana (disambiguation)
 Islam Gymkhana, Mumbai
 Jamalpur Gymkhana
 Jorhat Gymkhana Club
 Karachi Gymkhana Club
 Lahore Gymkhana Club
 Nairobi Gymkhana Club
 Parsi Gymkhana, Marine Drive
 Poona Gymkhana Ground
 HUDA Gymkhana Club, Sonipat
 HUDA Gymkhana Club, Karnal
 HUDA Gymkhana Club, Rohtak